Gaston Louis Alfred Leroux (6 May 186815 April 1927) was a French journalist and author of detective fiction.

In the English-speaking world, he is best known for writing the novel The Phantom of the Opera (1909), which has been made into several film and stage productions of the same name, notably the 1925 film starring Lon Chaney, and Andrew Lloyd Webber's  1986 musical.  His 1907 novel The Mystery of the Yellow Room is one of the most celebrated locked room mysteries.

Life and career 
Leroux was born in Paris in 1868, the illegitimate child of Marie Bidaut and Dominique Leroux, who married a month after his birth. He claimed an illustrious pedigree, including descent from William II of England (in French, Guillaume le Roux, son of William the Conqueror), and social connections such as having been the official playmate of Prince Philippe, Count of Paris at the College d'Eu in Normany. After schooling in Normandy and studying as a lawyer in Caen (graduating in 1889), He inherited millions of francs and lived wildly until he nearly reached bankruptcy. In 1890, he began working as a court reporter and theater critic for L'Écho de Paris. His most important journalism came when he began working as an international correspondent for the Paris newspaper Le Matin in 1893. He was present at, and covered, the 1905 Russian Revolution.  

Another case at which he was present involved the investigation and in-depth coverage of the former Paris Opera (presently housing the Paris Ballet).  The basement contained a cell that held prisoners of the Paris Commune.

He left journalism in 1907, after returning from covering a volcanic eruption and being immediately sent on another assignment without vacation time, and began writing fiction. In 1919, he and Arthur Bernède formed their own film company, Société des Cinéromans, publishing novels and turning them into films. He first wrote a mystery novel titled Le mystère de la chambre jaune (1907; English title: The Mystery of the Yellow Room), starring the amateur detective Joseph Rouletabille. Leroux's contribution to French detective fiction is considered a parallel to those of Sir Arthur Conan Doyle in the United Kingdom and Edgar Allan Poe in the United States.

Leroux published his most famous work, The Phantom of the Opera, as a serial in 1909 and 1910, and as a book in 1910 (with an English translation appearing in 1911). Balaoo followed in 1911, which was made into a film several times (in 1913, 1927 and 1942).

Leroux was made a Chevalier de la Legion d'honneur in 1909. He died at age 58 in Nice, France in 1927.

Personal life 
Leroux married twice, first to Marie Lefranc from whom he separated in 1902. Following his separation, he then lived with Jeanne Cayatte from Lorraine, with whom he had a son, Gaston, nicknamed Milinkij, and daughter Madeleine; they married in 1917 after Lefranc's death. In 1918, he founded a film production company, Société des Cinéromans with René Navarre and debuted two films Tue-la-Mort and Il etait deux petits enfants, in which his daughter played the lead role.

Novels

The Adventures of Rouletabille 
1907 - Le mystère de la chambre jaune (English translation: The Mystery of the Yellow Room, 1907; Rouletabille and The Mystery of the Yellow Room, 2009, translated by Jean-Marc Lofficier & Randy Lofficier)
1908 - Le parfum de la dame en noir (English translation: The Perfume of the Lady in Black, 1908)
1913 - Rouletabille chez le Tsar (Rouletabille and the Tsar; English translation: The Secret of the Night, 1914)
1914 - Rouletabille à la guerre (Rouletabille at War) consisting of
 Le château noir (The Black Castle)
 Les étranges noces de Rouletabille (The Strange Wedding of Rouletabille;)
1917 - Rouletabille chez Krupp (English translation: Rouletabille at Krupp's, 2013, by Brian Stableford)
1921 - Le crime de Rouletabille (The Crime of Rouletabille; English translation: The Slave Bangle, 1925; The Phantom Clue, 1926, translated by Hannaford Bennett)
1922 - Rouletabille chez les Bohémiens (Rouletabille and the Gypsies; English translation: The Sleuth Hound [UK], 1926; The Octopus of Paris [US], 1927, translated by Hannaford Bennett)

Chéri Bibi
 Première Aventures de Chéri-Bibi (1913, English translations: The Floating Prison [UK] and Wolves of the Sea [US], Translated by Hannaford Bennett in 1923)
 Chéri-Bibi et Cécily (1916, English translations: Missing Men: The Return of Cheri-Bibi [US], Cheri-Bibi and Cecily [UK], 1923, translated by Hannaford Bennett)
 Nouvelles Aventures de Chéri-Bibi (1921, English translations: Part I - The Dark Road, 1924; Part II - The Dancing Girl [UK], Nomads of the Night [US], Translated by Hannaford Bennett 1925)
 Le Coup d'État de Chéri-Bibi (1926, English translation: The New Idol, Translated by Hannaford Bennett 1928)

Other novels 

 La double vie de Théophraste Longuet (1903, English translations: The Double Life, 1909, translated by John E. Kearney; The Man with the Black Feather, 1912, translated by Edgar Jepson)
 Le roi mystère (1908)
 Le fauteuil hanté (1909, English translation: The Haunted Chair, 1931)
 Un homme dans la nuit (1910)
 La reine de Sabbat (1910, English translations: Part I as The Midnight Lady [UK], 1930; Part II as The Missing Archduke [UK], 1931)
 Le fantôme de l'Opéra (1910, English translation: The Phantom of the Opera, 1911)
 Balaoo (1911, English translation: Balaoo, 1913)
 L' épouse du soleil (1912, English translation: The Bride of the Sun, 1915)
 La colonne infernale (1916)
 Confitou (1916)
 L' homme qui revient de loin (1916, English translation: The Man who Came Back from the Dead, 1916)
 Le capitaine Hyx (1917, English translation: The Amazing Adventures of Carolus Herbert, 1922, translated by Hannaford Bennett)
 La bataille invisible (1917, English translation: The Veiled Prisoner [UK], 1923, translated by Hannaford Bennett)
 Tue-la-mort (1920, English translation: The Masked Man, 1929)
 Le coeur cambriolé (1920, English translation: The Burgled Heart, 1925; The New Terror, 1926)
 Le sept de trèfle (1921)
 La poupée sanglante (1923, English translations: The Kiss That Killed, 1934, translated by Hannaford Bennett)
 La machine à assassiner (1923, English translation: The Machine to Kill, 1934)
 Les ténébreuses: La fin d'un monde & du sang sur la Néva (1924)
 Hardis-Gras ou le fils des trois pères (1924, English translation: The Son of 3 Fathers, 1927, translated by Hannaford Bennett)
 La Farouche Aventure (serialized in "Le Journal" as La Coquette punie, 1924; English translation: The Adventures of a Coquette, 1926, translated by Hannaford Bennett)
 La Mansarde en or (1925)
 Les Mohicans de Babel (1926)
 Mister Flow (1927, English translation: Part I as The Man of a Hundred Faces [USA] and The Queen of Crime [UK], 1930; Part II as Lady Helena, or The Mysterious Lady [USA], 1931)
 Les Chasseurs de danses (1927)
 Pouloulou (1990, posthumous)

Short stories 

1887 - "Le petit marchand de pommes de terre frites"
1902 - "Les trois souhaits"
1907 - "Baïouchki baïou"
1908 - "L'homme qui a vu le diable" (English translation: "In Letters of Fire", 1908)
1911 - "Le dîner des bustes" (English translation: "A Terrible Tale", 1925)
1912 - "La hache d'or" (English translation: "The Gold Axe", 1925)
1924 - "Le Noël du petit Vincent-Vincent" (English translation: "The Crime on Christmas Night", 1930) 
1924 - "La femme au collier de velours" (English translation: "The Woman with the Velvet Collar", first English publication in Weird Tales, October 1929)
1924 - "Not'olympe" (English translation: "The Mystery of the Four Husbands", first English publication in Weird Tales, December 1929)
1925 - "L'Auberge épouvantable" (English translation: "The Inn of Terror", first English publication In Weird Tales, August 1929, Translated by Mildred Gleason prochet)

Plays 
1908 - Le Lys (co-author: Pierre Wolff)
1913 - Alsace (co-author: Lucien Camille)

Filmography
Films based on The Phantom of the Opera
Films based on the Rouletabille novels
, directed by Victorin-Hippolyte Jasset (1913, short film, based on the novel Balaoo)
Alsace, directed by Henri Pouctal (1916, based on the play Alsace)
L'Homme qui revient de loin, directed by Gaston Ravel (1917, based on the novel L'Homme qui revient de loin)
A halál után, directed by Alfréd Deésy (Hungary, 1920, based on the novel L'Homme qui revient de loin)
The Lily, directed by Victor Schertzinger (1926, based on the play Le Lys)
The Wizard, directed by Richard Rosson (1927, based on the novel Balaoo)
The Phantom of Paris, directed by John S. Robertson (1931, based on the novel Chéri-Bibi et Cécily)
Cheri-Bibi, directed by Carlos F. Borcosque (1931), alternative Spanish-language version of The Phantom of Paris
Compliments of Mister Flow, directed by Robert Siodmak (1936, based on the novel Mister Flow)
, directed by Léon Mathot (1938, based on the novel Chéri-Bibi)
Dr. Renault's Secret, directed by Harry Lachman (1942, based on the novel Balaoo), uncredited
 The Perfume of the Lady in Black (1949)
Chéri-Bibi, directed by Marcello Pagliero (1955, based on the novel Chéri-Bibi)
 Il profumo della signora in nero/ The Perfume of the Lady in Black (1974) Italian giallo
La Poupée sanglante, directed by Marcel Cravenne (1976, miniseries, based on the novel La poupée sanglante and its sequel, La machine à assassiner)
 The Perfume of the Lady in Black (2005)

Screenwriter
, directed by René Navarre (1920, serial with 12 episodes)
, directed by René Navarre (1921, serial with 12 episodes)
Il était deux petits enfants, directed by Lino Manzoni (1922)

Misattributions 
The Gaston Leroux Bedside Companion, an anthology published in 1980 and edited by Peter Haining, as well as the Haining-edited The Real Opera Ghost and Other Tales By Gaston Leroux (Sutton, 1994), include a story attributed to Leroux entitled The Waxwork Museum. A foreword alleges that the translation by Alexander Peters first appeared in Fantasy Book in 1969 (but no original French publication date is given). Neither "Alexander Peters" nor "Fantasy Book" appear to exist, and the text of the story is, in fact, a word-for-word copy of the story Figures de cire by Andre de Lorde which was published as Waxworks in the 1933 anthology Terrors: A Collection of Uneasy Tales, edited (anonymously) by Charles Birkin. The confusion has sometimes caused Leroux to be erroneously credited with the stories from the 1933 film Mystery of the Wax Museum, the 1953 film House of Wax (both of which were based on a story by Charles S. Belden) or, particularly, the 1997 Italian film Wax Mask (for example, in Troy Howarth's Splintered Visions: Lucio Fulci and His Films). No such story by Leroux exists, though some confusion may have been the result of chapter IX in Leroux's novel La double vie de Théophraste Longuet, which is entitled, Le masque de cire (translated as The Wax Mask).

References

External links 

 
 
 
 
 About Gaston Leroux, gaston-leroux.net
 Books and Biography of Leroux, Gaston , readprint.com
  L'univers de Joseph Rouletabille, rouletabille.perso.cegetel.net
 Everything about Phantom legend and his creator, Gaston Leroux , ladyghost.com
 
  Gaston Leroux, his work in audio version , litteratureaudio.com  
Play Alsace on Great War Theatre

1868 births
1927 deaths
Writers from Paris
French crime fiction writers
French journalists
French fantasy writers
19th-century French writers
20th-century French novelists
French male novelists
French horror writers
20th-century French male writers
French male non-fiction writers
Writers of Gothic fiction
Recipients of the Legion of Honour